Madi Kalyanpur is a village development committee in Chitwan District in the Narayani Zone of southern Nepal. At the time of the 1991 Nepal census it had a population of 6,598 people living in 1,238 individual households. Gopalnagar is a most popular village in Madi is also kalyan pur vdc. There has been a large community of Tharu people in the area for many years.

References

Populated places in Chitwan District